Lwówek  (1943-1945, German Leonberg) is a village in the administrative district of Gmina Sanniki, within Gostynin County, Masovian Voivodeship, in east-central Poland.

The village has a population of 450.

References

Villages in Gostynin County